Events in the year 1972 in Portugal.

Incumbents
President: Américo Tomás 
Prime Minister: Marcelo Caetano

Arts and entertainment
Portugal participated in the Eurovision Song Contest 1972, with Carlos Mendes and the song "A festa da vida".

Sport
In association football, for the first-tier league seasons, see 1971–72 Primeira Divisão and 1972–73 Primeira Divisão; for the Taça de Portugal seasons, see 1971–72 Taça de Portugal and 1972–73 Taça de Portugal. 
 4 June - Taça de Portugal Final

References

 
Portugal
Years of the 20th century in Portugal
Portugal